Las Choapas is a city and its surrounding municipality in the southeastern extremes of the state of Veracruz in Mexico. It is bordered by the municipalities of Uxpanapa, Minatitlán, Moloacán, and Agua Dulce in Veracruz, Huimanguillo in Tabasco, Cintalapa and Tecpatán in Chiapas, and Santa María Chimalapa in Oaxaca. Its major products are cattle breeding, corn, oil, fruit, sugar, and rubber. In the past it had a rice miller. It is one of the largest municipalities in Veracruz, with an area of 2,851.2 km² (1,100.85 sq mi). At the 2005 census the city had a population of 40,773 inhabitants, while the municipality had a population of 70,092. It is a very hot place, as temperature reaches up to 40 degrees Celsius. It has had some tornadoes in the past. It is connected to the communities of Raudales-Ocozocoautla in Chiapas through the Chiapas bridge.

Twelve bodies whose hands were tied are found along a road in Las Choapas on January 18, 2021. Witness say the men killed belonged to a family from the ejido of Aguas Frías. There are armed Grupos de Autodefensa Comunitaria (vigilantes) in Las Choapas and at least six drug cartels operate in the state.

References
Link to tables of population data from Census of 2005 INEGI: Instituto Nacional de Estadística, Geografía e Informática
Veracruz Enciclopedia de los Municipios de México

External links
Municipio de Choapas Official website
  Municipal Official Information

Municipalities of Veracruz